Promoting Equality in African Schools (PEAS) is a UK-based charity that builds, develops and runs low fee secondary schools in Uganda and Zambia.

Overview 

PEAS was founded by social entrepreneur John Rendel, a Teach First graduate, after visiting Uganda as a student and discovering the huge need for secondary education following the Ugandan governments' free universal primary education (UPE) policy. A similar trend across African has seen a boost in primary enrolment yet demand for secondary education is largely unmet: only about 23% of girls and 27% of boys are enrolled at secondary level, largely due to a lack of schools.

John Rendel, who has won an Unltd Award for Social Entrepreneurship was named in the Courvoisier Future 500 as one of five young leaders in the public and social sectors, founded Promoting Equality in African Schools (PEAS) in 2004

PEAS has teams in the UK, Uganda and Zambia, working to both raise money (in the UK) and implement the PEAS SmartAid approach. As a result, there are currently 22 schools across the PEAS network in Uganda and Zambia, with several new schools under construction, including one in Zambia. The existing PEAS schools are:
 Onwards and Upwards Secondary School
 Forest High School
 Sarah Ntiiro High School
 Kiira View Secondary School
 Green Shoots Secondary School
 Lamwo Kuc Ki Gen High School
 Hibiscus High School
 Pioneer High School

Principles 

PEAS is a young UK charity with no religious or political agenda. It is built on the following principles that aim to eliminate the problems experienced by many development organisations around the world.

 Sustainability – Every PEAS school covers its own running costs through low fees, government subsidies and income generating projects. Even the costs of the PEAS Uganda audit and educational inspection teams in Uganda are funded from excess revenues from the schools. Too many charities create dependency on donor funding and PEAS wants to show how much further money can go when it multiplies rather than undermines the energies of local communities.
 Local Ownership – Every PEAS school is run by Ugandans for Ugandans with support from UK partners. Each PEAS school has a local Board of Governors.
 Avoiding Market Distortions – PEAS schools are only built in areas where there is high demand for extra secondary school provision. In many areas, primary school leavers are unable to continue their education. Schools are marketed to those in greatest need and PEAS is working to help improve existing affordable schools at the same time as launching more and more within its network.
 Collaboration with government – PEAS works closely with the Ugandan Ministry of Education and the wider Ugandan government. The success of the schools depends on working within the educational framework laid out by the Ugandan government. In 2011, PEAS engaged further with the Ugandan Government through a Public-Private Partnership: 3 schools have rolled out the Universal Secondary Education (USE) program from the start of 2011. This means that education is free at the point of use for the student, thus expanding access to education to those otherwise unable to afford it.
 Transparency – PEAS never gives or receives bribes. This transparency is upheld through clear accounting and all PEAS annual accounts are available on their website for public perusal.

Values 

PEAS emphasises certain values that form the basis of their approach to education and schools:

 Equal access – PEAS schools are open to all students irrespective of ability and personal characteristics. PEAS schools never discriminate on the basis of ethnicity, religion, gender, physical disability or primary school performance.
 Personal security – PEAS schools are safe places that work to instill positive behavioural management systems, which help Ugandan staff move away from the use of corporal punishment. PEAS carries out risk assessment inspections in all the schools.
 Relevant learning – As a minimum, PEAS schools guarantee that students leave with literacy, numeracy, and at least one vocational skill. The latter is emphasised through Income Generating Projects such as bee-keeping and brick-making.
 Professional development – Through extensive inspection and reciprocal lesson observation, PEAS embeds student-centred learning and professional accountability where staff are responsible for their own success.

PEAS Uganda implements this PEAS vision, supporting each individual school. A Director of Finance financially audits every school, every term, to ensure efficiency and accountability. The Director of Educational Excellence inspects every school, every year, in order to maintain and improve teaching standards to help students learn more. Teachers benefit from continuous professional development, and salaries paid in full, on time, every month, which is a practice still rare in Uganda.

PEAS recently held its first annual teachers conference in Kampala, Uganda, bringing together teachers from across the PEAS network to share experiences and lesson. PEAS also promotes opportunities for the students to practice the skills they have learned, such as through a public speaking competition.

A unique approach to aid 

All PEAS schools operate a SmartAid model, a sustainable way of giving aid that prioritises local ownership and long-term sustainability.

The SmartAid model means that PEAS fundraises the capital for the building and start-up costs of a school. As a result, a PEAS school is able to open debt-free, allowing it to charge fees that are low because they merely need to cover the running costs of the school. The income from the low fees is supplemented by income-generating projects (which also teach the students important business and vocational skills).

PEAS schools typically become financially self-sustaining within a year of opening, allowing them to run independently of UK fundraising, which is the key to sustainable development. This means that funds raised by the PEAS team in the UK can be spent on creating even more new schools allowing PEAS to provide thousands and thousands of new secondary school places for young people.

Bridges to Africa 

Bridges to Africa is a national sponsored walk organised by PEAS, involving students from schools across London and the UK that has been running since 2006. Students join to complete 10 km bridge walks in London, Manchester and Birmingham. The money raised by students is used to help build new affordable secondary schools in Uganda and Zambia through the charity. In the past, the event has been attended by then Chancellor of the Exchequer Gordon Brown and Channel 4 new presenter Jon Snow. The walk takes place yearly, in May.

Over 5000 students have walked the bridges of the UK in the past years, helping to raise £100,000.

References

External links 
 www.peas.org.uk

Educational charities based in the United Kingdom
Foreign charities operating in Uganda
Foreign charities operating in Zambia